The Wutun language is a Chinese–Tibetan–Mongolian creole language. It is spoken by about 4,000 people, most of whom are classified as Monguor (Tu) by the Chinese government. Wutun speakers reside in two villages (Upper Wutun 上五屯 and Lower Wutun 下五屯) of Tongren County, eastern Qinghai province, China. It is also known as the Ngandehua language.

The two Wutun villages, as well as other villages in the area, were under the control of a Mongol banner for several centuries, and have long been regarded by governments as members of a Mongol ethnic group.  However, they self-identify as Tibetans.

Vocabulary
The greatest portion of Wutun lexical items is Chinese (but with their tones lost); a smaller one, from Amdo Tibetan, the local lingua franca; and an even smaller element comes from the Bonan Mongolian language.

Grammar
The Wutun grammar derives from Amdo Tibetan. There is also a Bonan influence.

History
A number of theories have been proposed about the origin of the Wutun villagers, and their peculiar dialect. The Chinese linguist Chen Naixiong infers from the vowel distribution of the Chinese lexical items in Wutun speech that their ancestors may have spoken an old Nanjing dialect. Others think that they may have been a group of Hui people (Chinese-speaking Muslims) from Sichuan who, for reasons unknown, converted to Tibetan Buddhism and moved to eastern Qinghai. In any event, historical documents as old as 1585 attest to the existence of the Wutun community.

Today's Wutun villagers do not speak Chinese, but the knowledge of Tibetan is common both in Wutun and in Tongren County in general, as the Tibetan language is the lingua franca of this multiethnic region, which is populated by Tibetans and Hui people, as well as some Han Chinese and Mongols.

See also
Tangwang language
Dao language (China)

References

Further reading
 Slater, Keith (2009). Review of Wutun by J. Janhunen, M. Peltomaa, E. Sandman, and Xiawudongzhuo. Asian Highlands Perspectives, 1: 367–371.

External links
 ELAR archive of Wutunhua (五屯話) primary data

Agglutinative languages
Chinese-based pidgins and creoles
Languages of China
Qinghai
Mandarin Chinese
Southern Mongolic languages
Tibetan language
Mixed languages